bbw Hochschule (bbw University of Applied Sciences) is a private, state-recognized university based in Berlin-Charlottenburg, Germany.

Founding and association 
bbw University of Applied Sciences is wholly owned and operated by the bbw Akademie für Betriebswirtschaftliche Weiterbildung GmbH. The university was founded in 2007 by bbw Bildungswerk der Wirtschaft in Berlin by the Berlin-Brandenburg Business Associations (UVB) and the Berlin University of Applied Sciences as scientific partners.

Profile 
The founding principle was to establish a new model of cooperation between business and science in the Berlin-Brandenburg metropolitan region, and to specialize in courses focused on economics and engineering. Due to the fact that the university operates under the trusteeship of the Berlin-Brandenburg Business Associations, its motto is "The University of Business for Business". This trusteeship model facilitates close connection between academic course content and its practical relevance to the workplace.

Specializations 
bbw University of Applied Sciences offers Bachelor and Master programs in full-time, dual and part-time form. The range of courses offered at the university are focused on three core subject groups: economics, industrial engineering and engineering sciences.

Department of Business and Economics

Economic subjects at Bachelor level:
 Health Management (B.A.)
 Trade Management and eCommerce (B.A.)
 Real estate management (B.A.)
 Media and event management (B.A.)
 Fashion management (B.A.)
 Tourism management (B.A.)
 Business Communication (B. Sc.)

Economic subjects at Master's level:
 International Business Management (M. A.)
 Health Management (M. A.)
 Green Business Management (M. A.)
 Management of Creative Industries (M. A.)
 Real Estate Project Management (M. A.)

Department of Engineering and Management

Industrial engineering:
 Logistics & Supply Chain Management (B. Sc.)
 Digital Industry 4.0 (B. Sc.)
 Management of Business Digitalization (B. Sc.)
 Business Management and Engineering (B. Eng.)
 International Technology Transfer Management (M. Sc.)
 Strategic Management in Logistics (Double Degree) (M. Sc.)

Engineering Sciences 
 Mechanical engineering with mechatronics (B. Eng.)
 Electrical engineering (B. Eng.)
 Electrical Engineering (Dual Study Program) with the specialization of Control and Safety Engineering (B. Eng.)
 Electrical engineering (dual study programme) specializing in traction power supply and overhead contact lines (B. Eng.)

Accreditation 
bbw University of Applied Sciences is accredited by the German Science Council  and system-accredited by the FIBAA Accreditation Commission

Studienkolleg 
bbw offers a Studienkolleg for international students intending to study in Germany and who do not have the required qualifications for direct entry (Hochschulzulassungsberechtigung). It offers the Studienkolleg in partnership with TU Berlin, where graduates of the Studienkolleg undertake the German University Entrance test (Feststellungsprüfung) following the conclusion of the course.

Academic partnerships 
Academic partners of the bbw include:

 Armenian State University of Economics, Armenia
 New Design University in St. Pölten, Austria
 Suzhou Institute of Construction and Communications, China
 Irup Regional Institute University in Saint-Étienne, France. 
 Budapest Metropolitan University, Hungary
 Indian Institute of Technology Delhi, India
 Vilnius Gediminas Technical University, Lithuania
 Universidade Lusófona do Porto, Portugal
 Babeş-Bolyai University, Romania
 Higher School of Economics, Moscow, Russia
 St Petersburg University of Management and Economics, Russia
 Peter the Great St.Petersburg Polytechnic University, Russia
 ESPRIT University, Tunis, Tunisia

References 

Educational institutions established in 2007
2007 establishments in Germany